Kalinin (Russian: Азард) was one of five s ordered for the Russian Imperial Navy during the 1910s. Not completed during the First World War, she was finally finished by the Soviets in 1927. She played a small role in the Winter War with the Baltic Fleet when Germany invaded the Soviet Union in 1941 (Operation Barbarossa), and was sunk by naval mines on 28 August 1941.

Design and description
Ordered from Böcker and Lange's shipyard in Reval, Estonia, in the 1912 naval program, the Izyaslav-class destroyers were improved versions of the preceding  with a heavier armament.

Bibliography 

 

 

 

Destroyers of the Soviet Navy
Ships built in Russia
1915 ships